The Siam Observer was the first English-language daily newspaper in Thailand when it was published on 1 August 1893 . It was founded by Mr. W. A. G. Tilleke and Mr. G. W. Ward. As of January 1906 and May 1918, its offices were located on the Oriental Avenue. It ceased publication in early 1933 due to financial reasons.  

A weekly edition entitled The Siam Weekly Mail for subscribers abroad was also published.

See also 
Timeline of English-language newspapers published in Thailand
List of online newspaper archives - Thailand

References

External links 
 

Defunct newspapers published in Thailand
English-language newspapers published in Asia
English-language newspapers published in Thailand
Newspapers established in 1893
Mass media in Bangkok